The following lists events that happened during 1863 in South Africa.

Incumbents
 Governor of the Cape of Good Hope and High Commissioner for Southern Africa: Sir Philip Wodehouse.
 Lieutenant-governor of the Colony of Natal: John Scott.
 State President of the Orange Free State:
 Marthinus Wessel Pretorius (until 17 June).
 Jacobus Johannes Venter (acting from 20 June).
 President of the Executive Council of the South African Republic: W.C. Janse van Rensburg (acting until instated).

Events
March
 18 – Joseph Allison becomes acting State President of the Orange Free State until 17 June during the absence of M.W. Pretorius.

April
 1 – The Cape Town and Green Point Tramway Company commences with the first horse-drawn trams in Cape Town from the foot of Adderley Street and out along Somerset Road to Green Point.

June

 17 – M.W. Pretorius resigns as State President of the Orange Free State.
 20 – Jacobus Johannes Venter becomes acting State President of the Orange Free State.

October
 23 – Acting President Willem Cornelis Janse van Rensburg becomes President of the Executive Council of the South African Republic.

November
 4 – The Cape Town-Wellington railway is officially inaugurated.

Births

Deaths

Railways

Railway lines opened
 4 November – Cape Western – Stellenbosch to Wellington, .

References

South Africa
Years in South Africa
History of South Africa